Brian Yandle is an American ice hockey coach and former defenseman who was a two-time All-American for New Hampshire.

Career
Yandle's college career started in 2002 with New Hampshire when he debuted for the ice hockey team. He began as a depth player and helped the Wildcats reach the 2003 NCAA championship game. As a sophomore, Yandle become the team's leading point producer from the blueline and continued in that capacity for the remainder of his time with UNH. For his third season, Yandle netted career highs for goals and points and was named an All-American. He was named team captain for his final season and, while his offensive numbers fell off slightly, Yandle made the All-American squad once more.

After the Wildcats were eliminated from the NCAA Tournament, Yandle finished the season with the Lowell Lock Monsters. He became a full-time professional player the following year but wasn't able to find a consistent spot on a roster. He became the Hockey Director at the Alpharetta Family Skate Center in Alpharetta, Georgia (a suburb of Atlanta) in 2008 and worked there for over two years. During that time he twice made further appearances with ECHL teams but it only amounted to 4 games over two seasons.

Fully retired as a player in 2010, Yandle returned home to Massachusetts and worked as a manager for ProEvolution Hockey and a coach for the Boston Jr. Terriers. He worked for both until 2015, which enabled him to be able to coach all three of his sons in junior hockey. In 2020, Yandle and fellow former college hockey player Mike Mottau began hosting a podcast called 'The Rink Shrinks'.

Personal life
Brian's father Bud played college hockey at Boston College. His uncle Mike is a former coach and currently works as a scout for the San Jose Sharks. His younger brother Keith also plays hockey and went on to a long career in the NHL.

Career statistics

Regular season and playoffs

Awards and honors

References

External links

1983 births
Living people
AHCA Division I men's ice hockey All-Americans
American men's ice hockey defensemen
Ice hockey people from Massachusetts
People from Milton, Massachusetts
New Hampshire Wildcats men's ice hockey players
Lowell Lock Monsters players
Phoenix RoadRunners players
Worcester Sharks players
Augusta Lynx players
Gwinnett Gladiators players
Toledo Walleye players